Mirissa Railway Station is a railway station on the coastal railway line of Sri Lanka. It is situated between Kamburugamuwa and Polwathumodara railway stations.

Location

Timetable
Trains to Colombo Fort are available at 6:22am and 2:22pm daily. Trains to Galle are available at 5:21am, 7:22am, 10:40am, 3:27pm and 5:12pm. Trains to Matara are available at 8:03am, 10:30am, 2:26p.m., 3:11pm and 9:25pm.

Continuity

References

Railway stations on the Coastal Line
Railway stations in Matara District